The AMD Bobcat Family 14h is a microarchitecture created by AMD for its AMD APUs, aimed at a low-power/low-cost market.

It was revealed during a speech from AMD executive vice-president Henri Richard in Computex 2007 and was put into production Q1 2011. One of the major supporters was executive vice-president Mario A. Rivas who felt it was difficult to compete in the x86 market with a single core optimized for the 10–100 W range and actively promoted the development of the simpler core with a target range of 1–10 W. In addition, it was believed that the core could migrate into the hand-held space if the power consumption can be reduced to less than 1 W.

Bobcat cores are used together with GPU cores in accelerated processing units (APUs) under the "Fusion" brand. A simplified architecture diagram was released at AMD's Analyst Day in November 2009. This is similar in concept with earlier AMD research in 2003, detailing the specifications and advantages of extending x86 "everywhere".

Design 
The Bobcat x86 CPU core design has since been completed and implemented in AMD APU processor products with a TDP of 18 W or less. The core is targeted at low-power markets like netbooks/nettops, ultra-portable laptops, consumer electronics and the embedded market. Since its launch, Bobcat-based CPUs have also been used by OEMs on larger laptops. Architecture specifics:
 64-bit core
 Out-of-order execution
 Advanced branch predictor
 Dual x86 instruction decoder
 64-bit integer unit with two ALUs
 Floating-point unit with two 64-bit pipes
 Single channel 64-bit memory controller
 32 KiB instruction + 32 KiB data L1 cache
 512 KiB - 1 MiB L2 cache
 MMX, SSE, SSE2, SSE3, SSSE3, SSE4A, ABM

In February 2013, AMD detailed plans for a successor to Bobcat codenamed Jaguar.

Features  
APU features table

Processors 

In January 2011 AMD introduced several processors that have implemented the Bobcat core. This core is in the following AMD Accelerated Processors:

^ E-Series & C-Series are standard parts, G-Series are embedded parts

See also 
 Bulldozer, a new core for the 10 to 125 Watt TDP range.
 List of AMD processors with 3D graphics

References

External links 
 Dailytech report
 RegHardware report
 Bobcat presentation (video)  at ISSCC 2011
 AMD Home Page

AMD x86 microprocessors
AMD microarchitectures
X86 microarchitectures